The Eswatini Stock Market is a small stock exchange headquartered in Mbabane, Eswatini. It was established in July 1990 as a non-bank credit institution by Barnabas Sibusiso Dlamini, a former World Bank executive who became Eswatini's Prime Minister, to enable ordinary Swatis to become stakeholders in their economy. All listings are included in the sole index, the ESE All Share Index, which is unweighted. There are a handful of listed public companies, as well as some listed government stock options, listed debentures, government guaranteed stock and non trading mutual funds.

Exchange Control approval is required for foreigners wishing to invest on the stock market.

Stockbrokers on the Exchange are licensed by the Financial Services Regulatory Authority (FSRA) and there is no regulation regarding the foreign ownership of brokerage firms.

See also
Economy of Eswatini

External links
Official site

Stock exchanges in Africa
Companies of Eswatini
Economy of Eswatini
Buildings and structures in Mbabane
1990 establishments in Swaziland